A comparison of tax rates by countries is difficult and somewhat subjective, as tax laws in most countries are extremely complex and the tax burden falls differently on different groups in each country and sub-national unit. The list focuses on the main  types of taxes: corporate tax, individual income tax, and sales tax, including VAT and GST and capital gains tax, but does not list wealth tax or inheritance tax.

Some other taxes (for instance property tax, substantial in many countries, such as the United States) and payroll tax are not shown here. The table is not exhaustive in representing the true tax burden to either the corporation or the individual in the listed country. The tax rates displayed are marginal and do not account for deductions, exemptions or rebates. The effective rate is usually lower than the marginal rate. The tax rates given for federations (such as the United States and Canada) are averages and vary depending on the state or province. Territories that have different rates to their respective nation are in italics.

Tax rates by countries and territories

See also 
 Corporate tax haven
 List of countries by social welfare spending
 List of countries by tax revenue as percentage of GDP
 List of countries by inheritance tax rates
 Tax Freedom Day
 Tax haven
 Tax rates in Europe
 VAT rates around the world
 Welfare state

Notes

References

External links 
 State Business Tax Climate Index Rankings, 2003–2008 in the U.S., Tax Foundation
 OECD Comparison of Wage Taxes (top combined marginal individual tax rates), Tax Foundation
 IBFD, Your Portal to Cross-Border Tax Expertise
 Paying Taxes – World Bank

 
Tax rates
countries by tax rates